The 1954 Giro di Lombardia cycling race took place on October 31, 1954, and was won by Bianchi-Pirelli's Fausto Coppi. It was the 48th edition of the Giro di Lombardia "monument" classic race.

General classification

References

1954
1954 in road cycling
1954 in Italian sport
1954 Challenge Desgrange-Colombo